The 2011–12 Spartak Moscow season was the 20th straight season that Spartak played in the Russian Premier League, the highest tier of football in Russia.

Season events
On 27 March 2011, Moscow Time was changed from UTC+03:00 with DST, to being permanently set at UTC+04:00.

Squad

On loan

Left club during season

Transfers

In

Out

Loans out

Released

Friendlies

2012 Copa del Sol

Final

Competitions

2010–11 UEFA Europa League

Knockout phase

Premier League

Regular season

Results by round

Results

League table

Championship group

Results by round

Results

League table

Russian Cup

2010–11

2011–12

2011–12 UEFA Europa League

Play-off round

Squad statistics

Appearances and goals

|-
|colspan="16"|Players away from the club on loan:

|-
|colspan="16"|Players who appeared for Spartak Moscow but left during the season:

|}

Goal scorers

Clean sheets

Disciplinary record

References

FC Spartak Moscow seasons
Spartak Moscow
Spartak Moscow